Nelly Moretto (20 September 1925 – 24 November 1978) was an Argentine composer and pianist.

She was born in Rosario, Argentina, and studied at the National Conservatory and the Torcuato di Tella Institute in Buenos Aires, and at the University of Illinois. She worked for a time at the electronic studio Estudio de Fonología Musical (EFM) at the University of Buenos Aires. She died in Buenos Aires.

Works
Selected works include:	 
Composición 9a for two instrumental groups, tape, dance and lights, 1965
Composición 9b for tape, 1966
Coribattenti for string quartet and tape, 1967
Composición No.13: In Memorian J. C. Paz for trumpet and tape, 1972
Composición No.14: Bah! le dije al tiempo for violin, trumpet, piano and tape, 1974/1975

References

1925 births
1978 deaths
20th-century classical composers
Argentine music educators
Argentine women educators
Women classical composers
Argentine classical composers
Women music educators
20th-century Argentine musicians
20th-century women composers
Argentine women composers